Eicochrysops sanyere is a butterfly in the family Lycaenidae. It is found in northern Cameroon.

References

Endemic fauna of Cameroon
Butterflies described in 1993
Eicochrysops